The Mount Kahuzi climbing mouse (Dendromus kahuziensis) is a rodent found only in the Democratic Republic of the Congo. It is listed as a critically endangered species due to illegal logging; it is also threatened by fire. Only two specimens have ever been found.  Both were found within 100m of each other on Mount Kahuzi. Its body length (excluding tail) is 50-100mm and its tail length is 65-132mm. Its habitat is tropical forests, and to navigate these forests it may use its semi-prehensile tail to hold on to tree branches. Its markings are brownish on the top and white to yellow on its underside, with strongly dark rings around its eyes.  As with other Dendromus,  it has three well defined toes.

References

  Database entry includes justification for why this species is critically endangered

Dendromus
Rodents of Africa
Endemic fauna of the Democratic Republic of the Congo
Mammals of the Democratic Republic of the Congo
Critically endangered fauna of Africa
EDGE species
Mammals described in 1969